Wong Sok I (born 15 January 1993) is a Macau karateka. She won one of the bronze medals in the women's kumite 55kg event at the 2018 Asian Games held in Jakarta, Indonesia. In her bronze medal match she defeated Syakilla Salni of Malaysia.

At the 2014 Asian Games held in Incheon, South Korea, she competed in the women's kumite 55kg event without winning a medal. She was eliminated in her first match by Mae Soriano of the Philippines. Soriano went on to win one of the bronze medals.

At the 2019 Asian Karate Championships held in Tashkent, Uzbekistan, she won one of the bronze medals in the women's kumite 55kg event.

Achievements

References 

Living people
1993 births
Place of birth missing (living people)
Macau female karateka
Karateka at the 2014 Asian Games
Karateka at the 2018 Asian Games
Medalists at the 2018 Asian Games
Asian Games medalists in karate
Asian Games bronze medalists for Macau
21st-century Macau people